Akkerhaugen is the administrative centre of Sauherad municipality, Norway. Its population (SSB 2007) is 369.
It is the location of Norsjø ferieland.

Villages in Vestfold og Telemark
Sauherad